Uloborus diversus is a species of cribellate orb weaver in the spider family Uloboridae. It is found in the United States and Mexico.

References

Uloboridae
Articles created by Qbugbot
Spiders described in 1898